SGE Group is a company holding a collection of businesses in the UK, including SGE Loans, SGE Payday, SGE Games, and SGE Discounts.

History
SGE Group was founded in 2009 and now holds some of the largest utility comparison sites within the UK, as well as payday loan companies and an online games initiative. SGE Group is based in Leeds, West Yorkshire, and is led by founder, director, and CEO Sally Hill.

SGE Group became part of the Leeds Community Foundation in 2012, joining the 100 Club. In 2013, the company became the first corporate supporter of the foundation to enable Payroll Giving, allowing employees to make an automatic gift each month to the work the foundation does within the local community where SGE operates.

Subsidiaries
SGE Group is divided into a number of subsidiaries that occupy a variety of business sectors.

SGE Loans
SGE Loans is a UK-based loan broker specialising in broking payday loans, logbook loans, secured and unsecured loans, tenant loans, and guarantor loans. The company was founded in 2011 and has its call and administration centre in Leeds. It doubled its staff in 2012 by adding 60 new jobs, and has also grown its turnover from £1.8m to £3m. In 2012, SGE Loans had approximately 500,000 customers and was working with 25 different lenders to offer lending products to consumers. Sally Hill is the CEO.

SGE Payday
SGE Payday is a trading style of SGE Loans and offers the same types of products, including payday, logbook, tenant, and guarantor loans. Both SGE Loans and its trading style are regulated by the Financial Conduct Authority.

SGE Games
SGE Games allows online gamers to compare various gaming websites in order to find games they might be interested in joining. It offers services for games such as sports betting, bingo, poker, and various other types of casino games.

SGE Discounts
SGE Discounts is a site that compiles online coupons, discount codes, and vouchers for various retailers.

References

Companies based in Leeds